Halle was one of the three Regierungsbezirke of Saxony-Anhalt, Germany, located in the south of the country.

History 
It was founded in 1952 while part of East Germany. Becoming effective on January 1, 2004, the Regierungsbezirk was disbanded. Its functions were taken over by the Landesverwaltungsamt, which has three offices at the former seats of the Bezirksregierungen.

Subdivisions

See also 
Bezirk Halle

Geography of Saxony-Anhalt
States and territories established in 1952
States and territories disestablished in 2004
Former states and territories of Saxony-Anhalt
1952 establishments in East Germany
2004 disestablishments in Germany
Former government regions of Germany